Kirchheim bei München is a municipality in the district of Munich, in Bavaria, Germany. It is located 14 km east of Munich (centre). As of 2020 it has a population of 12,787.

See also 

 Heimstettener See

References

Munich (district)